Ryan Verlinden (born 18 February 1986) is an Australian professional rugby league footballer who last played as a  for Workington Town in the Kingstone Press Championship.

Background
Verlinden was born in Sydney, Australia.

Career
Verlinden has previously played for the Cronulla Sharks, North Sydney Bears and the Newtown Jets in the NSW Cup.

References

External links
Workington Town profile

1986 births
Living people
Doncaster R.L.F.C. players
Featherstone Rovers players
Newtown Jets NSW Cup players
North Sydney Bears NSW Cup players
Rugby league props
Workington Town players
Australian rugby league players
Rugby league players from Sydney
Australian expatriate sportspeople in England
Australian people of Dutch descent